Sørli is a light rail tram stop on the Oslo Tramway.

Located at Sørli in Nordstrand, the station is situated between Holtet and Kastellet. It was opened on 11 June 1917. The station is served by lines 13 and 19.

References

Oslo Tramway stations in Oslo
Railway stations opened in 1917
1917 establishments in Norway